Albert Bruce Sabin (August 26, 1906 – March 3, 1993) was a Polish-American medical researcher, best known for developing the oral polio vaccine, which has played a key role in nearly eradicating the disease.  In 1969–72, he served as the president of the Weizmann Institute of Science in Israel.

Biography 
Abram Saperstejn (later Albert Sabin) was born in Białystok, Russian Empire (before and since 1918 in Poland), to Polish-Jewish parents, Jacob Saperstejn and Tillie Krugman. In 1921, he emigrated with his family on the SS Lapland which sailed from Antwerp, Belgium, to the Port of New York. In 1930, he became a naturalized citizen of the United States and changed his name to Sabin, as well as assuming the middle name Bruce. He graduated from high school in Paterson, New Jersey.

Sabin began university in a dentistry program, but was interested in virology and changed majors. He received a bachelor's degree in science in 1928 and a medical degree in 1931 from New York University.

In 1983, Sabin developed calcification of the cervical spine, which caused paralysis and intense pain. Sabin revealed in a television interview that the experience had made him decide to spend the rest of his life working on alleviating pain. This condition was successfully treated by surgery conducted at Johns Hopkins Hospital in 1992 when Sabin was 86. A year later, Sabin died in Washington, D.C., from heart failure.

Medical career
Sabin trained in internal medicine, pathology, and surgery at Bellevue Hospital in New York City from 1931 to 1933.  In 1934, he conducted research at The Lister Institute for Preventive Medicine in England, then joined the Rockefeller Institute for Medical Research (now Rockefeller University). During this time, he developed an intense interest in research, especially in the area of infectious diseases.

In 1939, he moved to Cincinnati Children's Hospital in Cincinnati, Ohio. During World War II, he was a lieutenant colonel in the U.S. Army Medical Corps and helped develop a vaccine against Japanese encephalitis.  Maintaining his association with Children's Hospital, by 1946, he had also become the head of Pediatric Research at the University of Cincinnati. At Cincinnati's Children's Hospital, Sabin supervised the fellowship of Robert M. Chanock, whom he called his "star scientific son".

Sabin went on a fact-finding trip to Cuba in 1967 to discuss with Cuban officials the possibility of establishing a collaborative relationship between the United States and Cuba through their respective national academies of sciences, in spite of the fact that the two countries did not have formal diplomatic ties.

In 1969–72, he lived  in Israel, serving as president of Weizmann Institute of Science in Rehovot. After his return to the United States, he worked (1974–82) as a research professor at the Medical University of South Carolina.  He later moved to the Washington, D.C., area, where he was a resident scholar at the John E. Fogarty International Center on the NIH campus in Bethesda, Maryland.

Polio research

With the menace of polio growing, Sabin and other researchers, most notably Jonas Salk in Pittsburgh and Hilary Koprowski and H. R. Cox in New York City and Philadelphia, sought a vaccine to prevent or mitigate the illness. This was complicated because there were multiple strains of the disease. In 1951, the National Foundation for Infantile Paralysis's typing program confirmed the existence of three main serotypes of poliovirus, since known as type 1, type 2, and type 3.

Salk developed an inactivated poliovirus vaccine (IPV), a "dead" vaccine given by injection, which was released for use in 1955. 
It was effective in preventing most of the complications of polio, but did not prevent the initial intestinal infection.

By carrying out autopsies of polio victims, Sabin was able to demonstrate that the poliovirus multiplied and attacked the intestines before it moved to the central nervous system. This also suggested that polio virus  could be grown in other tissues besides embryonic brain tissue, leading to easier and cheaper methods of vaccine development.  John Enders, Thomas Huckle Weller, and Frederick Robbins would successfully grow poliovirus in laboratory cultures of non-nerve tissue in 1949, an achievement that earned them the 1954 Nobel Prize in Physiology or Medicine.

Sabin developed an oral vaccine based on  mutant strains of polio virus that seemed to stimulate antibody production but not to cause paralysis. Recipients of his live attenuated oral vaccine included himself, family, and colleagues. Sabin's first clinical trials were carried out at the Chillicothe Ohio Reformatory in late 1954. From 1956–1960, he worked with Russian colleagues to perfect the oral vaccine and prove its extraordinary effectiveness and safety. The Sabin vaccine worked in the intestines to block the poliovirus from entering the bloodstream.

Between 1955 and 1961, the oral vaccine was tested on at least 100 million people in the USSR, parts of Eastern Europe, Singapore, Mexico, and the Netherlands. The first industrial production and mass use of oral poliovirus vaccine (OPV) from Sabin strains was organized by Soviet scientist Mikhail Chumakov. This provided the critical impetus for allowing large-scale clinical trials of OPV in the United States in April 1960 on 180,000 Cincinnati school children. The mass immunization techniques that Sabin pioneered with his associates effectively  eradicated polio in Cincinnati. Against considerable opposition from the March of Dimes Foundation, which supported use of Salk's relatively effective killed vaccine, Sabin prevailed on the Public Health Service (PHS) to license his three strains of vaccine. While the PHS stalled, the USSR sent millions of doses of the oral vaccine to places with polio epidemics, such as Japan.

Sabin's first oral poliovirus vaccine (OPV), for use against type 1 polioviruses, was licensed in the United States in 1961.  His vaccines for type 2 and type 3 polioviruses were licensed in 1962. At first, the monovalent poliovirus vaccines were administered together by being put on a sugar cube. In 1964, a single trivalent OPV containing all three viral serotypes was approved. Sabin's oral vaccine was easier to give than the earlier vaccine developed by Salk in 1954, and its effects lasted longer.  The Sabin vaccine became the predominant method of vaccination against polio in the United States for the next three decades. It  broke the chain of transmission of the virus and allowed for the possibility that polio might one day be eradicated.

Sabin also developed vaccines against other viral diseases, including encephalitis and dengue. In addition, he investigated possible links between viruses and some forms of cancer

Philanthropy 
Sabin refused to patent his vaccine, waiving commercial exploitation by pharmaceutical industries, so that the low price would guarantee a more extensive spread of the treatment. From the development of his vaccine Sabin did not gain a penny, and continued to live on his salary as a professor. The Sabin Vaccine Institute was founded in 1993 to continue the work of developing and promoting vaccines. To commemorate Sabin's pioneering work, the institute annually awards the Albert B. Sabin Gold Medal in recognition of work in the field of vaccinology or a complementary field.

Awards and recognition

 For the trivalent oral vaccine consisting of attenuated strains of all three types of the poliovirus, the president of the Supreme Soviet of the USSR awarded the highest civilian honour, the medal of the Order of Friendship Among Peoples (1986).
 Election to the Polio Hall of Fame, which was dedicated in Warm Springs, Georgia, on January 2, 1958
 Howard Taylor Ricketts Prize (1959)
 Robert Koch Prize (1962)
 Feltrinelli Prize (1964)
 Lasker-DeBakey Clinical Medical Research Award (1965)
National Medal of Science (1970)
Medal of Liberty (1986) 
Presidential Medal of Freedom (1986)
The Cincinnati Convention Center was named after Sabin from 1985 to 2006.
In 1999, Cincinnati Children's Hospital Medical Center named its new education and conference center for Sabin.
The street that runs between the University of Cincinnati College of Medicine and Cincinnati Children's Hospital Medical Center was renamed Albert Sabin Way on April 28, 2000.
On March 6, 2006, the U.S. Postal Service issued an 87-cent postage stamp bearing his image, in its Distinguished Americans series.
In early 2010, Sabin was proposed by the Ohio Historical Society as a finalist in a statewide vote for inclusion in Statuary Hall at the United States Capitol.
In 2012, Albert Sabin was named a "Great Ohioan" by the Capitol Square Foundation.

See also
List of Poles

References
Notes

Bibliography

Further reading
 The Myth of Jonas Salk: It was Albert Sabin’s vaccine, not Salk’s, that truly defeated polio. By Angela Matysiak July 1, 2005 MIT Technology Review
 Archives holding his papers

External links

 Dr. Albert Sabin's Discovery of the Oral Polio Vaccine, Cincinnati Children's Hospital Medical Center
 Obituary, NY Times, March 4, 1993
 Sabin Vaccine Institute
 Hauck Center for the Albert B. Sabin Archives, University of Cincinnati
 The Albert B. Sabin Digitization Project Blog, University of Cincinnati
 The Albert B. Sabin Archives Digital Collection, University of Cincinnati
 The Finding Aid for the Albert B. Sabin Papers, University of Cincinnati

1906 births
1993 deaths
American medical researchers
American people of Polish-Jewish descent
American pathologists
American virologists
Jews and Judaism in Cincinnati
Jewish American scientists
United States Army personnel of World War II
National Medal of Science laureates
People from Białystok
People from Belostoksky Uyezd
Polish emigrants to the United States
Jews from the Russian Empire
Polio
Presidents of Weizmann Institute of Science
New York University Grossman School of Medicine alumni
University of Cincinnati faculty
United States Army Medical Corps officers
Vaccinologists
Recipients of the Lasker-DeBakey Clinical Medical Research Award
Presidential Medal of Freedom recipients
Burials at Arlington National Cemetery
Presidents of universities in Israel
20th-century American Jews
Bellevue Hospital physicians
Foreign members of the Serbian Academy of Sciences and Arts